Gaston Maurice Strobino (August 23, 1891 – March 30, 1969) was an American athlete and runner. He won the bronze medal in the marathon event at the 1912 Stockholm Olympics.

Biography
Strobino was born in Büren an der Aare, Switzerland, by Italian family of Mosso Santa Maria (Biella, Italy) and moved from Italy to Paterson, New Jersey as a young man. He lived in South Paterson and worked as a toolmaker.

Running career
Strobino competed for the United States in the 1912 Summer Olympics held in Stockholm, Sweden in the marathon at the age of 20. The Olympic marathon was the first time he had ever raced the distance before, having qualified in a 12-mile race in New York City.

The race was notable for being run in particularly harsh conditions, with temperatures reaching 86 degrees Fahrenheit. He finished third behind South African runners Ken McArthur and Christian Gitsham, with Strobino suffering from raw and bleeding feet. His bronze medal was the sixth ever won by an American marathon runner.

The Olympics was the only time in his career that Strobino would ever race a marathon.

References 

American male long-distance runners
Olympic bronze medalists for the United States in track and field
Athletes (track and field) at the 1912 Summer Olympics
Sportspeople from Paterson, New Jersey
American people of Swiss descent
Italian emigrants to the United States
1891 births
1969 deaths
Medalists at the 1912 Summer Olympics
Italian expatriates in Switzerland